George H. Everett Jeffery, FSA (1855–1935) was the Curator of Ancient Monuments in Cyprus from 1903 until his death in 1935. He is known for his personal research and interest in the monuments of Cyprus.

Among his publications is the authoritative Description of the Historical Monuments of Cyprus, published in 1918 in the Government Printing Office and a second edition was published in 1983. This work focuses on the Byzantine and especially the Medieval monuments in the cities and villages of the island. Additionally, the work includes architectural plans of the monuments, made by Jeffery himself, and a few pictures. His public contributions include the supervision of the construction of the Cyprus Museum from 1908.

More recently Jeffery's diaries have been studied and published by Despina Pilides.

Publications

 Cobham, Claude Delaval, and George H. Everett Jeffery. An Attempt at a Bibliography of Cyprus. Cyprus: Printed at the G.P.O., Nicosia, 1929.
 Jeffery, George H. Everett. A Description of the Historic Monuments of Cyprus. Studies in the archæology and architecture of the island. With illustrations [and plans], etc. Nicosia: W. J. Archer, 1918.
 Jeffery, George H. Everett. A Brief Description of the Holy Sepulchre, Jerusalem, and Other Christian Churches in the Holy City, With Some Account of the Mediæval Copies of the Holy Sepulchre Surviving in Europe. Cambridge: University Press, 1919.
Jeffery, George H. Everett. Cyprus Under  an  English  King  in  the  Twelfth  Century. Cyprus: Printed at the G.P.O., Nicosia, 1926. Reprint London, 1973.

See also 

 Claude Delaval Cobham
 Rupert Gunnis
 Department of Antiquities, Cyprus

Notes

British curators
Historians of Cyprus
1855 births
1935 deaths
British historians